The following is a list of FCC-licensed radio stations in the U.S. state of Missouri, which can be sorted by their call signs, frequencies, cities of license, licensees, and programming formats.

List of radio stations

Defunct
 KADI
 KADY
 KBMX
 KBZI
 KCHR
 KCSW-LP
 KDFN
 KDKD
 KDMC-LP
 KDNA
 KESM
 KFMZ
 KIRL
 KITE
 KLWT
 KMTS
 KQBD
 KQPW-LP
 KQXQ
 KUKU
 KWK
 KXBR
 KXOK
 KZJF
 KZQZ

References

 
Missouri